VMS may refer to:

Communication and transportation
 Video management system, most often associated with digital CCTV surveillance
 Voice mail system, an alternate term for voicemail messaging
 An abbreviation for Vietnam Mobile Telecom Services, known as MobiFone   
 Variable-message sign, an electronic traffic sign often used on highways
 Virgin mothership, a carrier plane for Virgin Galactic spacecraft (see Virgin Galactic#Motherships)
 Valley Metro system, in Phoenix, Arizona
 Vessel monitoring system, a tracking system for commercial fishing vessels
 The ICAO airline code of His Royal Highness The Crown Prince Maha Vajiralongkorn, a holding airline established under the name of King Rama X of Thailand that maintains legal ownership of his private fleet of aircraft

Computers
 OpenVMS or VAX/VMS (Virtual Memory System), a computer operating system
 VMS (Visual Memory System) or VMU (Visual Memory Unit), a storage device for the Sega Dreamcast console
 Vulnerability management solution (or system)
 Vendor management system

Schools
 Vail Mountain School, in Colorado
 Vaughn Municipal Schools in New Mexico
 Vallivue Middle School, in the Vallivue School District, Idaho
 Vandenberg Middle School, in the Lompoc Unified School District, California
 Vincent Mary School of Science and Technology, Suvarnabhumi Campus, Assumption University of Thailand

Other uses
 Visitor Management system for managing the check-in/check-out process for visitors, contractors or staff at premises.
 Vendor management system, for managing vendors or temporary staff
 Volcanogenic massive sulfide ore deposit
 Voluntary milking system, an alternate name for an automatic milking system in dairy farming
 Voynich manuscript, an illustrated codex hand-written in an unknown writing system
 Virginia Motor Speedway
 Vasomotor symptoms, or hot flashes, a symptom of menopause